MINDS International (Mobile Information and News Data Services for 3G) is an association of news agencies that collaborate in the digital media business. MINDS was founded in 2004 by the World Association of Newspapers and News Publishers and five news agencies, with funding from the European Union. Currently, the MINDS network consists of more than twenty member agencies from around the world.

MINDS is an organisation in which agencies co-operate on issues including editorial and technology. MINDS links senior executives from all areas of news agencies (CEO and Managing Directors, Editors-in-Chief, Commercial and Technology Directors, Heads of Strategy and Business Development). The aim is to develop services that are relevant for digital customers and new media businesses. Its objectives include the exchange of existing knowledge, sharing ideas and experiences, and supporting joint initiatives and cooperation in the creation of new services.

Altogether, the MINDS agencies want to support the future development of the media industry.

Member agencies
The MINDS network consists of the following member agencies:
 AA - Anadolu Agency (Turkey)
 AAP - Australian Associated Press (Australia)
 AFP - Agence France-Presse (France)
 ANP - Algemeen Nederlands Persbureau (The Netherlands)
 ANSA - Agenzia Nazionale Stampa Associata (Italy)
 AP - Associated Press (USA)
 APA - Austria Presse Agentur (Austria)
 Belga Agence de presse Persbureau (Belgium)
 CP - The Canadian Press (Canada)
 ČTK Česká tisková kancelář (Czech Republic)
 dpa - Deutsche Presse-Agentur (Germany)
 Agencia EFE (Spain)
 Kyodo News (Japan)
 Lusa (Portugal)
 NTB - Norsk Telegrambyrå (Norway)
 PAP - Polska Agencja Prasowa (Poland)
 :en:PA Media (United Kingdom)
 Ritzaus Bureau (Denmark)
 sda - Schweizerische Depeschenagentur (Switzerland)
 STT Lehtikuva - Suomen Tietotoimisto Lehtikuva (Finland)
 TASS - Russian News Agency (Russia)
 TT - Tidningarnas Telegrambyrå (Sweden)

References

News agencies based in Germany
Organisations based in Frankfurt
Organisations based in Vienna